The Abduction of Figaro is a comic opera in three acts, described as "A Simply Grand Opera by P. D. Q. Bach", by Peter Schickele. It is a parody of opera in general, and the title is a play on two operas by Wolfgang Amadeus Mozart: The Abduction from the Seraglio, K. 384, and The Marriage of Figaro, K. 492. Those two operas, as well as Così fan tutte and Don Giovanni, and Gilbert and Sullivan's The Pirates of Penzance are among the core inspirations for the piece. The Abduction of Figaro is numbered S. 384, 492 in Schickele's catalogue of works.

Schickele was commissioned to "discover" this opera by the Minnesota Opera, where the piece premiered on April 27 and 28, 1984. In addition to parodying Mozart, the music incorporates diverse influences and musical quotes, from traditional camp songs like "Found a Peanut" to popular songs like "Macho Man" by the Village People. The opera has been released on VHS and DVD.

Roles

Synopsis of scenes
1. Introductory remarks by Prof. Peter Schickele
2. Opening credits
3. Overture
Act 1: A town on the seacoast of Spain or Italy or somewhere
Scene 1: Figaro's bedroom in the palace of Count Almamater
4. Introduction: "Found a peanut!"
5. Recitative: "Ah, dear husband"
    Aria: "Stay with me"
6. Recitative: "Suzanna"
7. Recitative: "Dog!"
    Aria: "Perfidy, thy name is Donald"
8. Recitative: "I am distraught"
9. Quartet: "Love is gone"
Scene 2: A courtyard of the palace
10. Recitative: "Well, here we are"
11. Aria: "Behold, fair maiden"
12. Recitative: "Just a moment"
      Duet: "Thy lofty tree"
Scene 3: Figaro's bedroom
13. Recitative: "And here is my husband"
14. Recitative: "Hold it!"
      Aria: "My name is Captain Kadd"
15. Recitative: "Now that you've heard"
16. Sextet: "What a downer!"
Scene 4: The courtyard
17. Recitative: "Schlepporello"
      Aria: "No man"
Scene 5: At the dock
18. Recitative: "What a strange turn of events"
19. Quintet and chorus: "Ah, though we must part"
20. Act 1 finale

21. Introduction to act 2
Act 2: Somewhere in the Turkish Empire
Scene 1: At the seashore
22. Duet: "God be praised"
Scene 2: In front of the Pasha's palace
23. Aria: "Fish gotta swim"
24. Chorus: "Hey, make way"
25. Dance of the Seven Pails
26. Recitative: "Your immenseness"
27. Duet, chorus, and dialogue: "Who is the highest"
28. Quartet: "May I introduce"
Scene 3: A courtyard of the palace
29. Dialogue and recitative: "Why?"
      Aria and dialogue: "Macho, macho"
30. Cavatina and dialogue: "You can beat me"
31. Act 2 finale

Act 3: A tropical forest
32. Ballet
33. Trio and dialogue: "A magic forest"
34. Duet and dialogue: "I am a swineherd"
35. Finale (part 1) and dialogue
36. Aria and dialogue: "Why, oh why"
37. Finale (part 2)
38. Curtain calls and closing credits
39. Closing remarks by Prof. Schickele

DVD bonus tracks
Excerpts from the Gross Concerto for Divers Flutes and Orchestra, S. −2
Professor Peter Schickele in conversation with Gordon Hunt

References

External links
 

P. D. Q. Bach
Operas
1984 operas
English-language operas
English comic operas
1984 video albums
Works based on Die Entführung aus dem Serail
Works based on The Marriage of Figaro
Works based on Così fan tutte
Works based on Don Giovanni